KYBC (1600 kHz) is a commercial AM radio station licensed to Cottonwood, Arizona, and serving the Verde Valley.  It is owned by the Yavapai Broadcasting Corporation, headed by W. Grant Hafley.  KYBC has a soft oldies – adult standards radio format.  Programming is provided by Westwood One's "America's Best Music" network, with national news updates provided by ABC News Radio.

KYBC is powered at 1,000 watts by day.  To avoid interference to other stations on 1600 AM, at night it reduces power to 46 watts.  The transmitter is off Route 89A in Cottonwood.  It is also heard on 93 watt FM translator K242BZ at 96.3 MHz.

History
On December 20, 1964, the station first signed on the air as KVIO.  It was originally a daytimer, required to go off the air at night.

In 1966, it was acquired by K-M Broadcasting.  The station was assigned the KYBC call letters by the Federal Communications Commission on May 24, 1996.

References

External links
 KYBC official website
 
 
 

YBC
Adult standards radio stations in the United States
Mass media in Yavapai County, Arizona
Radio stations established in 1996